Sveta gora (Bulgarian: Света гора, English: Holy Mountain) is a hill in Tarnovgrad (today Veliko Tarnovo) and was spiritual and literary center in the Second Bulgarian Empire.

History 
According to the historian, the legends and the ruins the hill became a religious center in the end of 12th century. Several monasteries were built on Sveta gora, including Orthodox monastery St. Mary Odigitriya. In this monastery were established Tarnovo Literary School from Euthymius of Tarnovo. Monastery around Veliko Tarnovo and Arbanassi as Patriarchal Monastery of the Holy Trinity were part from this spiritual center too. During the Ottoman rule, the hill were changed to a park and place for jollity.

References

Tourist attractions in Veliko Tarnovo Province
Hills of Bulgaria
Veliko Tarnovo